Cycnidolon immaculatum is a species of beetle in the family Cerambycidae. It was described by Galileo and Martins in 2004.

References

Cycnidolon
Beetles described in 2004